Alan William Golder (born August 9, 1955), also known as the "Dinnertime Bandit", is an American burglar who specialized in stealing jewellery from mansions, while their owners were inside their residences eating dinner.

Golder grew up in Lynbrook, New York, where his criminal career began at an early age, first stealing bicycles, then robbing stores. In 1978, an accomplice of Golder's killed Lawrence Lever during a robbery; Golder was subsequently arrested and served 15 years in prison, after cooperating with police and naming other criminals, including members of the Genovese crime family. During his time in prison, he sold an alleged autobiographical story to Paramount Pictures for $25,000, claiming to have robbed numerous celebrities; however his attorney claims he fabricated much of it. Released in 1996, Golder resumed burglary almost immediately. In 1998 he fled to Europe after being named in a warrant, where he is suspected to have continued committing burglaries.

Arrested in Antwerp, Belgium on December 14, 2006, Golder was extradited to the US in 2007 and was charged with 40 counts of burglary. Golder was convicted in Connecticut in August 2008, on 2 counts of burglary, a kidnapping charge and a larceny charge; the kidnapping charge was due to Golder having tied up a woman during a burglary. He was subsequently sentenced to 15 years in prison.

References

American people convicted of burglary
Living people
1955 births
Prisoners and detainees of Connecticut
American prisoners and detainees
People extradited from Belgium
People extradited to the United States